Marie-Alex Bélanger (born 13 April 1993) is a Canadian female volleyball player. She was part of the Canada women's national volleyball team, and participated at the 2017 FIVB Volleyball World Grand Prix, and 2018 FIVB Volleyball Women's World Championship.

University career
Bélanger played U Sports volleyball for the University of Montreal Carabins for five seasons from 2013 to 2018. At the U Sports National Championship, she was a member of the bronze medal Carabins team in 2015. In 2018, she won both the Mary Lyons Award for U Sports Women's Volleyball Player of the Year and also the BLG Award for the U Sports Female Athlete of the Year.

References

External links 
 FIVB profile
 https://volleymob.com/volleyball-canada-announces-womens-roster-for-world-championships/
 http://volleyballceltique.qc.ca/marie-alex-belanger-au-championnat-du-monde/
 https://www.smaeschpfeffingen.ch/9-marie-belanger.html

Living people
1993 births
Canadian women's volleyball players
Opposite hitters
Université de Montréal alumni
Montreal Carabins volleyball players